Petr Chlupáč (born 2002) is a speedway rider from the Czech Republic.

Speedway career
Chlupáč finished 7th in the 2021 European Pairs Speedway Championship, 5th in the 2021 Team Speedway Junior World Championship and competed in the 2021 Individual Speedway Junior World Championship.

Also in 2021, he competed as reserve rider in the 2021 Speedway Grand Prix. In 2022, he finished in 7th place during the World Under-21 Championship in the 2022 SGP2.

References 

2002 births
Living people
Czech speedway riders